A gubernatorial election was held on 7 April 1991 to elect the Governor of Hokkaido Prefecture.

Candidates
Takahiro Yokomichi - incumbent governor of Hokkaido, age 50.
 - member of the House of Representatives, age 49.
, age 62.
 - agricultural economist, age 60.

Results

References

北海道新聞社編『北海道年鑑』1992年版（北海道新聞社）

Hokkaido gubernational elections
1991 elections in Japan